Jin Qiang (Chinese: 金强; born 15 January 1993) is a Chinese professional footballer who plays for Shenzhen as a defensive midfielder.

Club career
Jin started his professional football career in 2013 when he was promoted to Chinese Super League side Dalian Aerbin's first team squad.  On 13 August 2014, he made his league debut for Dalian Aerbin in the 2014 Chinese Super League against Guangzhou Evergrande in a 2-1 defeat. Throughout the campaign he was given the chance to play in several games, however he was unfortunately part of the squad that was relegated to the second tier at the end of the league season. The following season Jin would establish himself as a regular within the team's midfield and by the end of the 2017 league season he would be a vital member of the squad that won the division championship and promotion back into the top tier.

On 14 February 2019, Jin transferred to Chinese Super League newcomer Shenzhen. He would go on to make his debut for Shenzhen in a league game against Hebei China Fortune F.C. on the 2 March 2019 in a 3-1 victory.

Career statistics
Statistics accurate as of match played 4 January 2022.

Honours

Club
Dalian Yifang
China League One: 2017

References

External links
 

1993 births
Living people
Chinese footballers
Footballers from Dalian
Dalian Professional F.C. players
Shenzhen F.C. players
Chinese Super League players
China League One players
Association football midfielders